The 2014 Richmond Kickers season was the club's twenty-second season of existence, seventh-consecutive year in the third-tier of American soccer, and their third-consecutive season playing in USL Pro. For the second season, the Kickers reached the semifinals of the USL Pro playoffs, before losing to the Harrisburg City Islanders. The Kickers finished shy of defending their regular season title, finishing in fourth place in the league table. In the Open Cup, the Kickers were eliminated in the fourth round proper by Major League Soccer outfit, New England Revolution.

First team squad
As of 30 March 2014

First team roster

Transfers

In

Out

Loan in

Loan out

Statistics

Appearances and goals 

|}

Competitions and results

Preseason

USL Pro

Overall standings

Match reports

U.S. Open Cup

Exhibitions

References 

2014 USL Pro season
2014
American soccer clubs 2014 season
2014 in sports in Virginia